Dalian Hi-tech Zone ( or ) or DHZ (variant officially used spellings include Dalian High-tech Zone) is an industrial district in the western suburbs of Dalian, Liaoning, China. It extends about 30 kilometres along Lüshun South Road and Guoshui Highway in Shahekou District and Lüshunkou District, where many  of the world's multinational technology companies have operations.

History
The construction of DHZ started in 1991.  Dalian Software Park was added in 1998.  The second phase of Dalian Software Park kicked off in 2003 at the site of Dalian Ascendas IT Park, which officially opened in 2007. DHZ is often called "Lushun South Road Software Industry Belt".

IT parks in Dalian Hi-tech Zone 
The whole area of Dalian Hi-tech Zone is under the oversight of the Dalian Hi-tech Industrial Zone Administrative Committee, but all parks therein are managed by private enterprises, except Dalian Hi-tech Zone and Animation Industry Base.  From east to west, they are:

Dalian Software Park

 Name: Dalian Software Park 
 Established: 1998
 Managed by Dalian Software Park Co., Ltd., a subsidiary of Yida Group
Address: 1 Digital Square, Dalian, Liaoning, China
 Area: 3 km²
 500 companies, including: Accenture, Genpact, HP, IBM (moving to Dalian Tiandi Software Park), Sony, Panasonic, NEC, Softbank, NEC.

Lingshui Bay General Headquarters
Now being reclaimed from the Yellow Sea

Qixianling Modern Service Industry Area
 Name: Qixianling Modern Service Industry Nucleus Function Area  
This area is often called "Dalian Hi-tech Zone" in its narrow sense.
 Established: 1991
 Managed by: Dalian Hi-tech Industrial Zone Administrative Committee
Address: 1 Gaoxin Street, Qixianling Industrial Base, Dalian, Liaoning, China
 Area: 2 km²
 800 companies, including Dalian Hi-Think Computer, Citibank, Dell, HiSoft Technology International, NHN Corporation.

Animation Industry Base
 Managed by: Dalian Hi-tech Industrial Zone Digital Entertainment Administrative Office
 110 companies, including Crystal Digital Technology.

Hekou International Software Park
 Managed by Hekou Village
 Companies: Yidatec

Dalian Ascendas IT Park

 Name: Dalian Ascendas IT Park 
 Established: 2007
 Managed by DLSP Ascendas Co., Ltd., a joint venture of Ascendas Corp. of Singapore and Dalian Software Park Co., Ltd.
Address: 1 Huixianyuan, Dalian Hi-tech Zone, Dalian, Liaoning, China
 Area: 200,000 m² (100,000 m² in No. 1 Building and 100,000 m² in No. 2 Building) See this guide map.
 59 companies, including CitiBank, Infosys Technologies, Konica Minolta, Omron.

Neusoft Group International Software Park
 Neusoft Group

Dalian Tiandi Software Park

 Name: Dalian Tiandi Software Park 
 Established: 2010
 Area: Jinhuai Building (30,000 m²).  See the area map in Project Introduction (Beware of music!).
 Managed by DLSP Shui On Development Co., Ltd., a joint venture of Shui On Land and Dalian Software Park Co., Ltd.
Address: No. 33, Hongchuan East Rd., Dalian Hi-tech Zone, Dalian, Liaoning, China
 13 companies, including IBM (3,000 employees have already moved), Kingsoft, Mitsui Real Estate.

Yingge Software Park
Under construction

Longtou Technology Park
Under construction

Transportation
 Roads: China National Highway 201 (also called Lushun South Road).  30 minutes by taxi from the hotels on Renming Road, downtown Dalian, to the Dalian Hi-tech Zone Administrative Committee.
City bus: Nos. 3, 10, 28, 531, 802 and other lines
Dalian-Lushun bus: From the north and south exits of Dalian Railway Station
 Tramway: No. 202 line (Xinggong Street to Xiaopingdaoqian).  Being extended via Huangnichuan and Longwangtang to Lüshun New Port.
 Dalian Metro: Line 1, Line 12
 Railway: 30 minutes by taxi from Dalian Railway Station
 Air: 30 minutes by taxi from Dalian Zhoushuizi International Airport
 Sea: 40 minutes by taxi from Dalian Port.  Yacht harbors in Xinghai Square, in front of Dalian Maritime University, and the Xiaopingdao reclaimed area.

Education
There are universities and research centers in this area, where about half of all the universities of Dalian are located.  From east to west are:
 Dalian Institute of Chemical Physics
 Dalian Ocean University
 Dongbei University of Finance and Economics (Including Dongbei University of Finance and Economics Press)
 Dalian Neusoft University of Information
 Dalian University of Technology (Including Dalian University of Technology Press)
 Dalian Maritime University
 Dalian University of Foreign Languages
 Dalian Medical University
 Software and IT Service Training Base of Ambow Education Group, Beijing

Accommodation
 Downtown and central business district on Renmin Road
Shangri-La, Furama, New World, Ramada, Nikko, Kempinski, Dalian Civil Aviation (Daiwa Royal)  and other hotels
 Dalian World Financial Center at Xinghai Square
Grand Hyatt hotel
 Dalian Hi-tech Zone
Heyi Hotel

Local environment

Restaurants
 Many Chinese restaurants (including Maizi Dawang on Shuma Road)
 Western restaurants (including West Coast coffee shop.  There are also KFC, McDonald's and Pizza Hut fastfood restaurants.)
 Japanese restaurants (including Momiji and Kappo Shimizu)
 Korean restaurants (including Kaicheng and Shengdao)

Cafeterias
 Cafeterias in major buildings, run by local Dalianese, as well as British and French catering companies

Apartments
 More expensive: Residencies at Shangri-La, Furama, Ramada, Nikko, Kempinski and other hotels
 Less expensive: International New Village in Dalian Software Park, Guigu Jiari (Silicon Valley Holiday) on Lushun South Road, etc.

Shopping
 Hypermarkets: Dashang Group's Newmart in Heishijiao, Walmart on Shuma Road, and Carrefour, Mykal on Xi'an Road Commercial Zone & Qingniwaqiao.

Schools
In Dalian City, there are:
 Kindergartens
 Municipal Bilingual School (Chinese/English)
 Dalian Maple Leaf International School (English), Japanese School (at Fujiazhuang) and Korean School (in Dalian Development Area)

Medical facilities
 No. 2 Hospital, attached to Dalian Medical University

Recreational areas
 Xinghai Square, Xinghai Park, Longwangtang Cherry Blossom Park.

Hi-tech parks in other areas of Dalian 
There are other parks, often called the "hi-tech zones" of Dalian.

Ganjingzi District
Dalian BEST City  is located along Lushun North Road.

Jinzhou District
New Jinzhou District including Dalian Development Area has DD Port and other hi-tech areas.

See also
List of technology centers
 Dalian Software Park

References

External links 
 Official site 

Dalian
High-technology business districts in China